Colts Drum and Bugle Corps (previously known as the Junior Dukes, Legionnaires, and Colt .45) is a World Class competitive junior drum and bugle corps based in Dubuque, Iowa. The Colts are a member of Drum Corps International, along with their feeder corps, the Colt Cadets, which participates in Open Class.

History
The corps was founded in 1963 as the Junior Dukes, a junior corps to the Dukes of Dubuque, a senior corps. The Junior Dukes were sponsored by the local American Legion post and participated in parades. The corps performed for two years under that name before the Dukes of Dubuque disbanded in 1965. After the disbandment of the senior corps, the name was switched to the Legionnaires, and in 1966, the corps began to accept female members. By 1967, the corps was large enough to create a feeder corps known as the Cadets, and the Legionnaires began touring in regional VFW competitions.

In 1969, the corps changed their name again, then to Colt .45. In 1971, the corps began to compete in VFW national competitions and began to rise in the ranks, earning as high as 5th place in 1973. That same year Colt .45 joined Drum Corps International, taking 28th in their first championship competition. Three years later, citing the negative association with both firearms and Colt 45 beer, the ".45" was dropped and the current naming convention was adopted.

The Colts continue to compete as a member of Drum Corps International, earning their first finals spot in 1993. They earned their highest ranking in 1995 at 9th place, and have since made a total of 9 finals placements, most recently in 2022.

Show summary (1973-2022)
Source:

References

External links 
 
 Colts Drum and Bugle Corps in Encyclopedia Dubuque

Drum Corps International World Class corps